Gustavo Francisco Petro Urrego  (born 19 April 1960) is a Colombian economist, politician, and former guerrilla fighter who is the current president of Colombia since 2022. After taking office, Petro was considered by analysts as Colombia's first-ever left-wing president.

At 17 years of age, Petro became a member of the guerrilla group 19th of April Movement, which later evolved into the M-19 Democratic Alliance, a political party in which he was elected to be a member of the Chamber of Representatives in the 1991 Colombian parliamentary election. He served as a senator as a member of the Alternative Democratic Pole (PDA) party following the 2006 Colombian parliamentary election with the second-largest vote. In 2009, he resigned his position to run in the 2010 Colombian presidential election, finishing fourth in the race.

Due to ideological disagreements with the leaders of the PDA, he founded the Humane Colombia movement to compete for the mayoralty of Bogotá. On 30 October 2011, he was elected mayor in the local elections, a position he assumed on 1 January 2012. In the first round of the 2018 Colombian presidential election, he came second with over 25% of the votes on 27 May, and lost in the run-off election on 17 June. He defeated Rodolfo Hernández Suárez in the second round of the 2022 Colombian presidential election on 19 June.

Early life
Petro was born in Ciénaga de Oro, in the department of Córdoba, in 1960. His great-grandfather, Francesco Petro, migrated from Southern Italy in 1870, which is why he has Italian citizenship. Petro was raised in the Catholic faith and has stated that he has a vision of God from liberation theology, although he also questioned God's existence.

Seeking a better future, Petro's family decided to migrate to the more prosperous Colombian inland town of Zipaquirá, just north of Bogotá, during the 1970s.

Petro studied at the Colegio de Hermanos de La Salle, where he founded the student newspaper Carta al Pueblo ("Letter to the People").

M-19 militancy 
Convinced that the guerrilla struggle could change the political and economic system of Colombia, around the age of 17, Petro became a member of the 19th of April Movement (M-19), a Colombian guerrilla organisation that emerged in 1974 in opposition to the National Front coalition after allegations of fraud in the 1970 election. He used the pseudonym of Aureliano, a character in the novel One Hundred Years of Solitude.

With the M-19, he led the seizure of a piece of land to house 400 poor families who had been forcibly displaced by paramilitary groups, and then contributed to the construction of what would become the Bolívar 83 neighborhood. He then went completely underground and became close to Carlos Pizarro, one of the main commanders of the M-19, and insisted with him on the need for a negotiated political solution to the Colombian armed conflict and on the transition to a Constituent Assembly.  During his time in 19 April Petro became a leader, and was elected ombudsman of Zipaquirá in 1981 and councilman from 1984 to 1986.

In 1985, Petro was arrested by the army for the crime of illegal possession of arms. he was tortured for ten days in the stables of the XIII Brigade, then sentenced to 18 months in prison. It was during his incarceration that Petro shifted his ideology, no longer viewing armed resistance as a feasible strategy to gain public backing. In 1987, M-19 engaged in peace talks with the government.

Education 
Petro graduated with a degree in economics from the Universidad Externado de Colombia and began graduate studies at the Escuela Superior de Administración Pública (ESAP). Later, he earned a master's degree in economics from the Universidad Javeriana. He then traveled to Belgium and started his graduate studies in Economy and Human Rights at the Université catholique de Louvain. He also began his studies towards a doctoral degree in public administration from the University of Salamanca in Spain.

Political career

Early career 
After the demobilization of the M-19 movement, former members of the group (including Petro) formed a political party called the M-19 Democratic Alliance which won a significant number of seats in the Chamber of Representatives in 1991, representing the department of Cundinamarca. In July 1994, he met with Lieutenant Colonel Hugo Chávez, who had just been released from prison for his role in the February 1992 Venezuelan coup d'état attempt, for an event on Bolivarian thought at the Simón Rodríguez Cultural Foundation in Bogotá, directed by José Cuesta, Petro's parliamentary assistant.

In 2002, Petro was elected to the Chamber of Representatives representing Bogotá, this time as a member of the Vía Alterna political movement he founded with former colleague Antonio Navarro Wolff and other former M-19 members. During this period, Petro received 25 votes of 125 consulted representatives to be chosen as the 2006 "Best Congressman", against 24 that held that no representative was worthy of being considered the best because the legislative period was characterized by absenteeism and shortage of sessions.

As a member of Vía Alterna, Petro created an electoral coalition with the Frente Social y Político to form the Independent Democratic Pole, which fused with the Alternativa Democrática in 2005 to form the Alternative Democratic Pole, joining a large number of leftist political figures.

In 2006, Petro was elected to the Senate, mobilizing the second highest voter turnout in the country. During that year he also exposed the Parapolitics scandal, accusing members and followers of the government of mingling with paramilitary groups in order to "reclaim" Colombia.

Opposition to the Uribe government 

Senator Petro vehemently opposed the government of Álvaro Uribe. In 2005, while a member of the Chamber of Representatives, Petro denounced the lottery businesswoman Enilse López (also known as "La Gata" [the cat]). As of May 2009, she was imprisoned and under investigation for ties to the (now disbanded) paramilitary group United Self-Defense Forces of Colombia (AUC). Petro alleged that the AUC financially contributed to the presidential campaign of Álvaro Uribe in 2002. Uribe refuted these statements by Petro but, during his presidential reelection campaign in 2006, admitted to having received financial support from Enilse López.

During Álvaro Uribe's second term as president, Petro encouraged debate on the Parapolitics scandal. In February 2007 Petro began a public verbal dispute with President Uribe when Petro suggested that the president should have recused himself from negotiating the demobilization process of paramilitaries in Colombia; this followed accusations that Uribe's brother, Santiago Uribe, was a former member of the Twelve Apostles paramilitary group in the mid-1990s. President Uribe responded by accusing Petro of being a "terrorist in civilian clothing" and by summoning the opposition to an open debate.

On 17 April 2007, Petro began a debate in Congress about CONVIVIR and the development of paramilitarism in Antioquia Department. During a two-hour speech, he revealed a variety of documents demonstrating the relationship between members of the Colombian military, the current political leadership, narcotraffickers and paramilitary groups. Petro also criticized the actions of Álvaro Uribe as Governor of Antioquia Department during the CONVIVIR years, and presented an old photograph of Álvaro Uribe's brother, Santiago, alongside Colombian drug trafficker Fabio Ochoa Vázquez.

The Minister of Interior and Justice, Carlos Holguín Sardi and the Minister of Transport, Andrés Uriel Gallego, were asked to defend the president and his government. Both of them questioned Petro's past as a revolutionary member and accused him of "not condemning the warfare of violent people". Most of Petro's arguments were condemned as mud-slinging. The day after this debate the president said "I would have been a great guerrilla because I wouldn't have been a guerrilla of mud, but a guerrilla of rifles. I would have been a military success, not a fake protagonist".

President Uribe's brother, Santiago Uribe, affirmed that his father and the Ochoa brothers had grown up together and were in the Paso Fino horse business together. He then mentioned that he also had many photographs, taken with many people.

On 18 April 2007, the Vigilance and Security Superintendency released a communique rejecting Petro's accusations concerning the CONVIVIR groups. The Superintendency said that many of the groups mentioned were authorized by the Departments of Sucre and Córdoba, but not by the Antioquia government; it also added that Álvaro Uribe, then Antioquia's governor, had eliminated the legal liability of eight CONVIVIR groups in 1997. It was also mentioned that the paramilitary leader known as "Julian Bolívar" had not yet been identified as such and was not associated with any CONVIVIR during the authorization of these groups.

Death threats 
Petro has frequently reported threats against his life and the lives of his family, as well as persecution by government-run security organizations. On 7 May 2007 the Colombian army captured two Colombian Army intelligence non-commissioned officers who had been spying on Petro and his family in the municipality of Tenjo, Cundinamarca. These members had first identified themselves as members of the Departamento Administrativo de Seguridad (DAS) the Colombian Intelligence Agency but their claims were later denied by Andrés Peñate, director of the agency.

2010 presidential campaign 

In 2008, Petro announced his interest in a presidential candidacy for 2010. He distanced himself from government policies and, along with Lucho Garzón and Maria Emma Mejia, led a dissenting faction within the Alternative Democratic Pole. Following Garzón's resignation from the party, Petro proposed a "great national accord to end Colombia's war," based on removing organized crime from power, cleaning up the judicial system, land reform, democratic socialism and a security policy differing considerably from the policies of President Uribe. On 27 September 2009, Gustavo Petro defeated Carlos Gaviria in a primary election as the Alternative Democratic Pole candidate for the 2010 presidential election.

In the presidential election held on 30 May 2010, Petro did better than polls had predicted. He obtained a total of 1,331,267 votes, 9.1% of the total, finishing as the fourth candidate in the vote total, behind Germán Vargas Lleras and ahead of Noemí Sanín.

Mayoralty of Bogotá (2012–2014; 2014–2015) 
On 30 October 2011, Gustavo Petro won the municipal election in Bogota. He took office on 1 January 2012. He is the first ex-guerrilla to hold such an important position in Colombia.

The program of his Bogotá Humana movement was to fight poverty and inequality through public policies for the poorest, to protect the environment and fight climate change, to strengthen citizen participation in decision-making, and to fight structural corruption, as the previous mayor and his senatorial brother had enriched themselves by granting public contracts to companies in exchange for bribes. However, his program is not well received by the traditional ruling classes; even before his inauguration, several media outlets were calling for his resignation. 

During Petro's administration, measures such as the prohibition on the carrying of firearms were advanced, which led to the reduction of the homicide rate, reaching the lowest figure of the last two decades; interventions were carried out by the police in El Bronx sector of the city, where seizures of drugs and weapons were made; the Women's Secretariat was created; the LGBTI Citizenship Center was inaugurated; and 49 centers for birth control and abortion care were also created in cases permitted by law.

The social policies implemented and the improvement of public services accelerated the reduction of poverty; during his administration, nearly half a million people were lifted out of poverty and infant mortality dropped. This is the result of a combination of public policies (minimum drinking water supply for every family, preventive health program in poor neighborhoods, kindergartens, strengthening of public education, youth centers for art education, preferential transportation rates for the poor).

Petro proposed a policy to conserve the wetlands of Bogotá and plan for the preservation of water in the face of global warming. He also announced plans to plant over 200,000 trees. Following the order of the Constitutional Court, a process of suppression of animal-drawn vehicles used by waste pickers began, putting many out of work; some were replaced by automotive vehicles and subsidies.

In June 2012, Petro banned bullfighting within the Santamaría Bullring, a measure that was later rejected by the Constitutional Court.

In the area of public health, Mobile Attention Centers for Drug Addicts (CAMAD) were established. With these measures, the aim was to reduce the dependency of the destitute in the streets of the sector to the providers of narcotic drugs, providing psychological and medical assistance.

During his administration, the District put into operation two primary-care clinics at the San Juan de Dios Hospital, which had closed in 2001. The Mayor promised that he would allocate resources to purchase the Hospital grounds and reopen one of the buildings of the complex. The project was delayed due to the Cundinamarca government's suspension of the sale of the properties. On 11 February 2015, as mayor of Bogotá, the protocol ceremony for the reopening of the San Juan de Dios Hospital Complex was finally formalized. The District bought the hospital intending to reopen it. During his last month in office, before the liquidation of Saludcoop on 1 December 2015, the district had difficulties with the new patients who became part of the EPS Capital Salud.

During Petro's administration, the application of the Integrated Public Transport System (SITP) began, inaugurated in mid-2012. Likewise, subsidies paid by the District to reduce Transmilenio tariffs were created. In turn, from early 2014 the administration provided a 40% subsidy for the value of the ticket for the population affiliated to SISBEN 1 and 2, for which it allocated 138 billion pesos. This subsidy was not available to all individuals immediately, as they were required to register in a database.

Petro proposed the construction of a subway for the city. During his administration, he contracted studies of the subway infrastructure to a Colombian-Spanish company for $70 billion pesos, which successfully ended at the end of 2014. The subway plans contracted by Petro's administration were discarded by his successor Enrique Peñalosa, who opted for an elevated railway system with allegedly lower investment required and better coverage. These claims have been refuted by several independent studies that have found that both the social and economic cost of an elevated railway system is higher than the original underground railway system planned by the previous administration.

Recall 

During his administration as mayor, Petro faced a recall process started by opposition parties and supported by the signatures of more than 600,000 citizens. After the legal verification, 357,250 signatures were validated, many more than legally required to start the process. On 9 December 2013, he was removed from his seat and banned from political activity for 15 years, by Inspector General Alejandro Ordóñez Maldonado, following the sanctions stipulated by the law. His sanction was allegedly caused by mismanagement and illegal decrees signed during the implementation of his waste collection system. This led to a protest which deemed the Inspector's move as controversial, politically biased and undemocratic.

Despite being granted an injunction by the Inter-American Commission on Human Rights, which suspended the sanction imposed by Inspector General Ordóñez, President Juan Manuel Santos upheld the removal and Petro was removed from office 19 March 2014. For his temporary replacement, Santos appointed as Mayor the Labor Minister, Rafael Pardo. On 19 April 2014, a magistrate from the Superior Tribunal of Bogotá ordered the president to obey the recommendations laid out by the Inter-American Commission on Human Rights. Petro was reinstated as mayor on 23 April 2014 and finished his term.

2018 presidential campaign 

In 2018, Gustavo Petro was again a presidential candidate, this time getting the second best result in voting counting in the first round on 27 May, and advanced to the second round. His campaign was run by publicists Ángel Beccassino, Alberto Cienfuegos and Luis Fernando Pardo. A lawsuit was filed by citizens against Iván Duque, Petro's right-wing opponent, alleging bribery and fraud. The news chain Wradio made the lawsuit public on 11 July, which was presented to the CNE ('Consejo Nacional Electoral', National Electoral Council, by its acronym in Spanish). The state of the law suit will be defined by the Magistrado Alberto Yepes.

Petro's platform emphasized support for universal health care, public banking, a rejection of proposals to expand fracking and mining in favor of investing in clean energy, and land reform. Before the runoff, Petro received endorsements from senator-elect Antanas Mockus and senator Claudia López Hernández, both members of the Green Alliance.

In the second round of voting, Duque won the election with more than 10 million votes, while Petro took second place with 8 million votes. Duque was inaugurated on 7 August; meanwhile, Petro returned to the Senate. He served until the inauguration of a new congress in 2022.

Petro received death threats from the paramilitary group Águilas Negras.

2022 presidential campaign 

In 2021, Petro declared that he would be running in the 2022 elections. In September 2021, Petro announced that he would retire from politics if his campaign were not to succeed, stating that he does not intend to be an "eternal candidate". Petro’s campaign platform included promoting green energy over fossil fuels and a decrease in economic inequality. He has promised to focus on climate change and reducing greenhouse gas emissions that cause it by ending fossil fuel exploration in Colombia. He also pledged to raise taxes on the wealthiest 4,000 Colombians and said that neoliberalism would ultimately "destroy the country". Petro also announced that he would be open to having president Iván Duque stand trial for police brutality committed during the 2021 Colombian protests. Furthermore, he promised to establish the ministry of equality. Following his victory in the Historic Pact primary, Petro selected Afro-Colombian Human Rights and environmental activist and recipient of the Goldman Environmental Prize, Francia Márquez, to be his running mate.

Among the key points of his program, he proposes an agrarian reform to restore productivity to 15 million hectares of land to end "narco-feudalism" (in Spanish, "narco-latifundismo"); a halt to all new oil exploration in order to wean the country off its dependence on the extractive and fossil fuel industries; infrastructure for access to water and development of the rail network; investment in public education and research; tax reform and reform of the largely privatized health system. Petro announced that his first act as president will be to declare a state of economic emergency to combat widespread hunger. He is advocating progressive proposals on women's rights and LGBTQ issues. Petro also stated that he would restore diplomatic relations with Venezuela. He proposed combatting Colombia's cocaine trade with the growth of legal marijuana, and has opposed extraditions of accused drug criminals to the United States.

Petro and his running mate Francia Márquez faced numerous death threats from paramilitary groups while on the campaign trail. Petro cancelled rallies in Colombiaʼs coffee region in early May 2022 after his security team uncovered an alleged plot by the La Cordillera gang. In response to this and many other similar situations, 90 elected officials and prominent individuals from over 20 countries signed an open letter expressing concern and condemnation of attempts of political violence against Márquez and Petro. The letter also highlighted the assassination of over 50 social leaders, trade unionists, environmentalists and other community representatives in 2022. Signatories of the letter included former Ecuadorian president Rafael Correa, American linguist and philosopher Noam Chomsky and member of the French National Assembly Jean-Luc Mélenchon. During the campaign, Petro received support from foreign politicians, such as former president of Uruguay, José Mujica and former Prime Minister of Spain, José Luis Rodríguez Zapatero.

During the campaign, his opponents said that he planned expropriation measures if he becomes president, and argued similarities with Venezuela's Nicolás Maduro. Proposals from Petro to change the nation’s economic model were criticized for increasing taxes on unproductive landowners and for upsetting oil and coal investors by his platform to move to clean energy. Critics said his efforts to shift more of Colombia's wealth to the poor could turn Colombia into another Venezuela, and also compared his ideas to those of the early days of Hugo Chávez's government in Venezuela. In response, he signed a public document on 18 April in which he pledged not to carry out any type of expropriation if elected. During a presidential debate hosted by El Tiempo on 14 March, candidates responded to a question about relations with Venezuela and Nicolás Maduro. Whilst other participants responded by stating Venezuela is a dictatorship and expressing reluctance toward restoring relations, Petro replied, "if the theory is that with a dictatorship you can't have diplomatic relations, and Venezuela is, [then] why does this government have relations with the United Arab Emirates, which is a dictatorship, perhaps worse [than Venezuela]?" He also stated that diplomatic relations are established with nations and not with individuals. Whilst he has praised former Venezuelan president Hugo Chávez for bolstering equality, Petro said during an interview with French newspaper Le Monde in May 2022 that Chávez made a "serious mistake of linking his social program to oil revenues". He also criticized Venezuela's commitment to oil by president Maduro. Petro argued that "Maduro's Venezuela and Duque's Colombia are more similar than they seem", pointing to the Duque administration's commitment to non-renewable energy and the "authoritarian drift" of both governments. General Eduardo Zapateiro, commander of the National Army of Colombia, also criticized Petro during the campaign, causing controversy.  Later, after the elections, the Colombian media Noticia Uno revealed that Gustavo Petro's campaign had been spied on by Colombian intelligence agents and that information had been passed on to the press to try to discredit him.

Petro received the most votes in the first round held on 29 May but fell short of the 50% required to avoid a runoff. He and Márquez faced the former mayor of Bucaramanga and businessman, Rodolfo Hernández Suárez and his running mate Marelen Castillo in the run-off on 19 June. Shortly after the first round, Luis Gilberto Murillo, who was the running mate of Sergio Fajardo on the Hope Center Coalition ticket, endorsed Petro for the second round. In the second round, Petro and Márquez won the election by winning 50.44% of the popular vote against Hernández.

Presidency (2022–present) 

Petro was sworn in on 7 August 2022.

He spent the month and a half between his election and his inauguration negotiating with centrist and right-wing political parties to build a majority in Congress, where the left had a minority in both houses. In exchange for several seats in his government, he obtained the support of the Liberal Party, the largest force in the House and third largest in the Senate, and the Party of the U. Both parties had called for votes against him in both the first and second rounds of the presidential election. In the end, his coalition includes a dozen political groups. The conservative reformist Álvaro Leyva was appointed to the Ministry of Foreign Affairs, and three former liberal ministers were appointed to Finance, Agriculture and Education. Human rights activist Leonor Zalabata was named ambassador to the United Nations, making her the first indigenous person to be appointed to the post, which until now has always been held by career diplomats.

A few days before his inauguration, on 26 July, he passed his first political test with the approval by the Senate of the Escazú Agreement, the most important environmental protection treaty adopted in Latin America, which had previously been rejected four times by the senators. Petro had made its ratification a campaign promise. However, the team in charge of the transition from the outgoing government warns that "the fiscal situation and the level of debt are even more critical than we imagined."

The arrival of Gustavo Petro as president was not well received by the army command and several generals spoke out in the press. The commander in chief of the army, Enrique Zapateiro, resigned from his position. On 12 August Petro appointed a new military command with the objective of "substantially increasing respect for human rights and public freedoms."

Colombia and Venezuela re-established diplomatic relations on 11 August after a three-year break. Petro announced plans to resume peace negotiations with the National Liberation Army (ELN) guerrillas, which had been suspended after the 2019 Bogotá car bombing, where more than 20 cadets at a police academy were killed.

Cabinet 

The cabinet of Petro's government took office on August 7, 2022, in conjunction with the inauguration of the president. It is considered by analysts as the country's first ever left-wing government.

José Antonio Ocampo, Professor of Economic and Political Development Concentration at the School of International and Public Affairs at Columbia University and former Under-Secretary-General for Economic and Social Affairs in the United Nations was appointed as Minister of Finance.

Protests 

A series of protests began in Colombia on 26 September 2022 against cross-sectoral structural reforms and the government of President Petro.

Agrarian reform 
At the beginning of his presidency, Gustavo Petro announced that he wanted to initiate agrarian reform to promote access to property for poor peasant families in a country where one per cent of farms hold 80 per cent of the cultivable land. Several difficulties must be overcome: the land registry is largely deficient (according to an official estimate, 65% of land is not formally titled), the state lacks the institutions and officials to enforce the law, and there are fears that the large landowners will rearm their paramilitary militias. Finally, indigenous and peasant movements have increased their land occupations to put pressure on the new government.

While it does not foresee any expropriation, the government intends to enforce the first chapter of the peace agreement signed in 2016 between the state and the FARC. The first chapter of the agreement, which was devoted to the agrarian question, provided for the distribution of three million hectares to peasants, but the government of Ivan Duque never implemented it. On the other hand, the government committed itself to buying three million hectares of arable land at market price. An agreement to this effect was reached in early October 2022 with the powerful Federation of Ranchers (Fedegan). However, the agreement has been criticized by the mayor of Bogotá, Claudia López, who said that "the land grabbers must be told the truth and receive compensation. They do not deserve impunity, let alone billions," recalling that the report of the Truth Commission confirms the historical responsibility of the ranchers in paramilitarism, displacement and land plundering. In addition, some experts on agrarian issues have estimated that the land purchases would have a high cost for the public finances: "Since the market is not competitive, the ranchers will sell at a high price." The government has also pledged to build infrastructure to enable farmers to sell their crops.

Policies and views

Environmental issues
In a widely recognized speech before the United Nations General Assembly on September 20, 2022, Petro asked the question "What is more poisonous for humanity, cocaine, coal or oil?" He said the "addiction to irrational power, profit and money” being at the heart of the climate crisis and called the war on drugs a failure, accusing the global north of turning a blind eye to the destruction of the Amazon.

Foreign affairs 

 Petro had an ambiguous position on Venezuela under Hugo Chávez and Nicolás Maduro. While he has not denounced its human rights violations or described Maduro as a dictator, unlike Iván Duque, he also has not expressed unrestricted support, unlike Evo Morales.

Petro had met Chávez in 1994, on Seventh Street in Bogotá, after inviting the latter to come to Colombia to learn more about the new Political Constitution of 1991. At the Bridge of Boyacá, both "swore an oath of Bolivarian integration for Latin America". After Chávez's death in 2013, Petro affirmed that he was a "great Latin American leader", saying: "You lived in Chávez's times and maybe you thought he was a clown. You were fooled. You lived in the times of a great Latin American leader". He also expressed: "Even if many do not like him, Hugo Chávez will be a man who will be remembered by the history of Latin America, his critics will be forgotten", "a friend and a hope is gone".

In 2016, Petro ironized about the crisis in Venezuela, in a year when shortages and malnutrition were rampant, by posting a photo of a supermarket with full shelves on Twitter and saying, "I went into a supermarket in Caracas and look what I found. Did RCN fool me?". In a 2018 interview in Al Punto, Mexican journalist Jorge Ramos asked Petro if he considered Chávez as a political leader, to which Petro answered that he believed that "he was popularly elected", but that authoritarianism in Venezuela under Maduro was putting an end to all freedoms.

In 2019, Petro criticized the idea of an American military intervention against Maduro's regime, stating that "only Venezuelans should solve Venezuela's problems", that "it's not a coup d'état backed by foreigners that will bring democracy to Venezuela", and that "what is happening in Venezuela is a frontal struggle for the control of oil". In 2020, Petro claimed that if Colombia reestablished diplomatic relations, cut off by Maduro, and sold food to Venezuela, Venezuelan immigration would cease.

In response to Maduro's attack of him and president of Chile Gabriel Boric as well as president of Peru Pedro Castillo, describing them as a "cowardly left wing" attacking the Bolivarian Revolution in February 2022, Petro responded on social media saying "I suggest Maduro to stop his insults. Cowards are those who do not embrace democracy", adding, "Get Venezuela out of oil, take it to the deepest democracy, if you must step aside, do it".

Following the results of the second round of the 2022 presidential elections in Colombia, Maduro congratulated Petro on his victory, saying "I congratulate Gustavo Petro and Francia Márquez, for the historic victory in the presidential elections in Colombia. The will of the Colombian people was heard, who came out to defend the path of democracy and peace. New times are on the horizon for this brother country".

In an August 2022 interview with the Colombian magazine Semana, Petro stated that he would only recognize Nicolás Maduro as Venezuelan president, and that the partially recognized interim president of Venezuela, Juan Guaidó, was a "non-existent" president, and that Guaidó had no control over the country. Guaidó reproached the lack of recognition of his interim government, and responded in a press conference: "I would have expected that his first decision would not have been to approach one who today shelters world terrorism in Venezuela".

On 28 September 2022, Colombia's ambassador to the Organization of American States, Luis Ernesto Vargas, declared that he would condemn human rights violations in Nicaragua when necessary, but that he would prioritize the integration of the countries in the region.

In October 2022, Petro claimed that the number of migrants returning to Venezuela at that time outnumbered those leaving the country, arguing that there were more Colombian migrants entering Venezuela than Venezuelans entering Colombia.

Social issues 
Promoting progressive views and policies towards LGBT issues, he opened the Center for LGBTI Citizenship when he was Mayor of Bogotá. The opening of the Subdirectorate for LGBT Affairs had the purpose of restoring rights and eradicating discrimination. Several LGBT people held administrative positions.

He has supported an advance in the elimination of obstacles and stigmas to recognize the union of same-sex couples and their rights to adoption and social security. In addition to that, he affirmed that he will support and accompany with medical and psychosocial support the transition of gender with explicit protocols and with the participation of the trans population, and will promote a national program of safe cities free of violence and discrimination against women and people with sexual orientations, as well as diverse gender identities.

In the past, he received criticism from Francia Márquez, who was later the Historic Pact's vice presidential nominee. She denounced that Petro betrayed the agreement to include female leaders and Afro leaders on their lists to Congress. In response, and after a storm broke out, Petro asked that the men registered in the Senate move one seat from eleven to enable the space and comply with what she had said. Afro-Colombian communities were highlighted by the triumph of Gustavo Petro in the 2022 presidential election, where he swept the Pacific and Caribbean regions, both being places with the largest Afro-Colombian demographics.

Petro is a supporter of the feminist movement, with his government program including proposals such as the creation of the Ministry of Equality and a chapter dedicated to women. However, some of his proposals within the movement have been controversial.

Petro on the issue of abortion has been ambiguous. During 2020 and 2021, Petro has supported the idea of "zero abortion", but during an interview, he stated that "every society must prevent, with sexual education and technological measures so that abortion does not exist, I call that zero abortion. Abortion is not positive nor should it be encouraged, but that does not imply criminalizing women in that way, if you criminalize women you are not achieving a zero abortion society". Several supporters of the movement expressed their disagreement with Petro's statements, while some analysts, professors and politicians contradicted the proposals stating that a zero abortion society is "science fiction" and that Petro's statements are made to gather votes from members of the pro-life movement. In October 2021, Márquez said that Petro should "learn more about feminism". To placate the criticism that feminists made of him at the time, Petro published the photo of the Christmas gift that his daughter Sofía gave him: a book titled "Feminism for beginners".

In 22 February 2022, one day after the Colombian Constitutional Court decriminalized abortion, Petro said on Twitter: "I congratulate the women who waged the fight against the criminalization of abortion that criminalized them and killed them. Their victory is theirs. The empowerment of women that arises from here, sexual education and freedoms are the best way to protect life", and despite the fact that two weeks after the court's decision, he again mentioned the issue of "zero abortion", he has not mentioned it again nor does it appear in his government program.

In June 2022, Petro attended the Feminist Debate, a space convened by more than 30 social organizations of women, feminists and the LGBTIQ+ population, in order to present their proposals to the presidential candidates. Petro wore a green scarf throughout the event. Petro promised that he will enforce the constitutional ruling that decriminalized the interruption of pregnancy until the 24th week. He also said: "When a woman makes that free decision, it is not criminal (...) abortion is a woman's free decision and therefore there should be no social sanction".

With the issue of the land conflict in which indigenous people have been affected in the country, he invited on his the indigenous movement, the sugar cane agro-industrial sector (Asocaña) and the social movements of northern Cauca to initiate "the first regional dialogue of Colombia for Peace" to seek a "solution to the conflict over land".

In August 2022, Petro proposed decriminalizing the production of cocaine and marijuana, declaring "It is time for a new international convention that accepts that the war on drugs has failed."

In January 2023, Petro indicated that he wanted Colombia to move towards a preventive healthcare system in which disease is prevented as far as possible. Under the system the state would employ doctors to care for people who live in remote places and to care for poor farmers. Petro also said he would deliver a monthly bonus of about US$110 to almost three million recipients of the state's age based pension.

Personal life 

Petro has been married three times. At age 26, Petro and his childhood sweetheart Katia Burgos eloped due to the Burgos family's disapproval of the union. The couple produced a son, Nicolás, but he was primarily brought up by Burgos and Petro's mother, Clara Nubia-Urrego, as Petro had gone into hiding due to his rebel activity. Shortly after, while on the run, Petro began a relationship with Mary Luz Herrán, ten years his junior. He met Herrán when he was seeking refuge in her hometown. They were together for over 15 years and had two children, a daughter Andreá and a son Andrés. Both reside abroad and keep a low profile. Petro met his current wife, Verónica Alcocer, in the late 1990s at a conference where Petro filled in for the absent primary speaker. Alcocer was a law student 17 years his junior. Petro divorced Herrán and married Alcocer in 2003; he initially had a shaky relationship with the conservative Alcocer family, but he later won the approval of Verónica's father. Petro and Alcocer have two daughters, Sofía and Antonella. Alcocer has a son from a previous relationship who, like Petro's oldest son, is named Nicolás. Petro adopted Nicolás in September 2022.

Awards
 2006: Best representative, by the Chamber of Representatives, and Character of the year, by the readers of the newspaper El Tiempo.
 2007: Letelier-Moffitt Human Rights Award, by the Institute for Policy Studies (IPS).
 2011: Luis Carlos Galán Sarmiento Medal, by the Senate of the Republic and Chamber of Representatives Ethics Committees.
 2013: Defenzoor of the year, by Defenzoores Association, and City Climate Leadership Award, by C40 and Siemens.
 2018: Honorary Professor, by the National University of Lanús.
 2022: Grand Collar of the Order of Boyacá, Collar of the Order of San Carlos, Grand Cross Extraordinary of the National Order of Merit and Order of Merit Colonel Guillermo Fergusson, by president Iván Duque.

Notes

References

External links

 Personal website of Gustavo Petro
 Colombia Humana official website
 Colombia Politics political biography, Gustavo Petro
 Biography and program by CIDOB
 Interview with Gustavo Petro
 Petro's profile at CityMayors

 
1960 births
Living people
People from Córdoba Department
Mayors of Bogotá
19th of April Movement members
Alternative Democratic Pole politicians
Alternative Way politicians
Colombian economists
Colombian people of Italian descent
Colombian Roman Catholics
Members of the Chamber of Representatives of Colombia
Members of the Senate of Colombia
Pontifical Xavierian University alumni
Universidad Externado de Colombia alumni
University of Salamanca alumni
Humane Colombia politicians
20th-century Colombian politicians
21st-century Colombian politicians